Levi is a fell located in Finnish Lapland, and the largest ski resort in Finland. The resort is located in the village of Sirkka, Kittilä municipality and is served by Kittilä Airport and Kolari railway station.

There are 43 ski slopes (17 of which are floodlit) and 27 ski lifts in Levi. Ascending the fell are 2 gondolas, 1 chairlift, 14 T-bar lifts, 5 stick lifts, 4 rope tows, and 1 magic carpet for children. Levi is one of two locations of gondola lifts in Finland, and has been chosen as the best domestic skiing resort in Finland four times.

Levi is an early stop on the FIS Alpine Ski World Cup circuit, hosting slaloms in mid-November; the races in 2019 were held slightly later (November 23–24). With snowmaking, the climate provides a reliable early season technical venue in Europe, prior to the late autumn events in North America.

The slopes in Levi are mostly suitable for beginners or intermediates, but there are also three black slopes for experts. Levi has one superpipe, one halfpipe, two streets, two snow parks, 10 free children's slopes and seven slope restaurants.

The skiing and snowboarding season in Levi is fairly long, often lasting from October to mid-May. The ski school provides instruction in downhill skiing, snowboarding, telemark skiing and cross-country skiing. Cross-country skiers have illuminated ski tracks and snow that lingers well into the spring.

The resort's latitude, north of the Arctic Circle, usually guarantees generous snow cover and sub-freezing temperatures (< ) throughout winter.  It also allows for excellent chances of observing the Northern Lights. Although very popular in winter, Levi is very quiet in the summertime, yet still a good base location for exploring the surrounding areas.

At  from the centre of Levi is Luvattumaa, Levi Ice Hotel & Ice Gallery;  from Levi is the Snow Village Lainio, where one can view snow and ice buildings, eat in an ice restaurant (in Lainio), or experience a night's sleep in an ice room.

Gallery

See also
 Ruka, Finland

References

External links

Levi Finland – Information on the area and resort
Snow Village.fi – Lainio Snow Village
Levi Finland – Airlines and Destinations visits Levi Finland

Kittilä
Buildings and structures in Lapland (Finland)
Ski areas and resorts in Finland
Tourist attractions in Lapland (Finland)